J-POP SUMMIT is a Japanese cultural festival held every summer since 2009 in San Francisco, California, United States.[1] It is hosted by SUPERFROG Project, a 501(c)(3) non-profit organization.

The festival brings together different aspects of Japanese culture, such as music, fashion, film, art, games, tech-innovations, anime, food, as well as niche subcultures. The festival is also getting attention by foreign companies and organizations as a promotional opportunity and an entry point into US markets.

In 2014, the festival was held in Japantown and had over 125,000 in attendance over two days. Since 2015, the festival re-launched as an indoor event and expanded its area to different locations in the city: Fort Mason Center, Union Square, NEW PEOPLE Cinema, and Castro Theatre.

History 
J-POP SUMMIT first took place as the opening ceremony of NEW PEOPLE building at Japan Town in San Francisco in 2009. Since then it has become an annual festival to introduce the latest Japanese pop culture including anime, manga, food, sake, games, fashion, films, and music. In recent years, Interactive (tech innovations) and Travel have been added to its content diversity to make stronger bonds between IT companies in the two countries and also to revitalize Japanese inbound tourism from the US. The event has provided good opportunities for Japanese companies to expand their business to the U.S. market.[4][5]

"POP IS OUR TRADITION" is the theme of J-POP SUMMIT.[6]

Guest Artists 
Takako Tokiwa, a Japanese actress and Yoshitaka Amano, a well-known character designer joined the first J-POP SUMMIT in 2009, and since then, prominent guests from a variety of fields including artists, actors, directors, designers, voice actors, programmers have been invited from Japan each year. One of the most popular program is the J-POP LIVE concert event and Japan's top musical acts such as Kyary Pamyu Pamyu, JAM Project, WORLD ORDER, Silent Siren, Tomomi Itano, May'n, Tokyo Girls’ Style, YANAKIKU and many more have performed on the J-POP SUMMIT main stage.

Location 
J-POP SUMMIT was held in Japantown as a free outdoor event from 2009 until 2014, and it moved to Fort Mason Center in 2015. When it was in Japantown, the streets were turned into a pedestrian precinct. The number of attendees kept increasing year by year and finally in 2014, it went over the crowd capacity of Japantown. Thus J-POP SUMMIT made its big move to an indoor festival venue to pursue the next level of exhibition and staging, and became a ticketed event in 2015. In 2017, J-POP SUMMIT will be held again at the Fort Mason Center For Arts & Culture (Festival Pavilion, Firehouse and outside Parking area)

J-POP SUMMIT in 2018 was canceled due to unforeseen circumstances with the venue.

Related Events

Japan Film Festival of San Francisco 
This is the first Japanese Film Festival in Northern California held along with J-POP SUMMIT for about 2 weeks. At this festival, selected Japanese films are screened; and guests are typically invited from Japan to make appearance on stage for US premieres. Originally, “film” was just one of the contents at J-POP SUMMIT, but for the popularity it gained, it became an independent festival in 2013. Tadanobu Asada, a Japanese actor, received the first Japan Film Festival of San Francisco Honorary Award at the opening night event that was held at Castro Theatre in 2015.

Sake Summit 
Sake Summit is a sake tasting event at J-POP SUMMIT. Major sake manufacturers, distributors, and retailers gather at one place to promote Japanese sake culture. The number of sake labels available at this event is increasing every year and it reached 52 different bottles in 2015.

Ramen Summit 
Ramen Summit* is where the top ramen restaurants gather to show off their best broth and noodles. People can enjoy ‘slurping’ a variety of ramen, including Tonkotsu (pork bone broth), Miso, Shoyu (soy broth), Tsuke-men and more. The list of ramen shops that have participated are: Orenchi Beyond, Hinodeya Ramen & Bar, Marufuku Ramen, YOROSHIKU, nojo ramen tavern, Naruto Ramen, Ramen TAKA, and Iza Ramen.

See also
 History of the Japanese in San Francisco

References

External links 
J-POP SUMMIT Official Website

Cinema of Japan
Japanese-American culture in San Francisco
Anime industry
Japanese fashion
Rock festivals in the United States
Film festivals in the San Francisco Bay Area
Asian-American culture in California
Japanese idols
Non-profit organizations based in San Francisco
2009 establishments in California
Annual events in California
Film festivals established in 2009
Japanese idol events